Basil George Watson (12 October 1893 – 28 March 1917) was an Australian aviation pioneer who died in an aeroplane crash while testing his self-constructed plane on the day before a Red Cross fund-raising carnival at which he was scheduled to give a display of aerobatics.

Family
The son of James Isaac Watson (1865-1944), and Isabel Ada Watson (1867-1952), née Knight  and the grandson of the mining magnate, John Boyd Watson, and nephew of the Australian cricketer Billy Murdoch  Basil George Watson was born in Bendigo on 12 October 1893.

Education
Watson and his two brothers  Eric James Watson (1892-1964) and James Rudyard Watson (1900-1959)  attended Haileybury College at Brighton Beach, Victoria.

Aviator
Watson's family had an early interest in Aviation. On Monday morning, 21 March 1910, some 30 spectators witnessed Harry Houdini make an extended flight at Diggers Rest of 7min. 37secs., covering at least 6 miles, at altitudes ranging from 20ft. to 100ft. Basil Watson's father, mother, and younger sister, Venora, then aged 14, were among the spectators; and their names were included in the list of 16 spectator signatures on the certificate that verified Houdini's achievement.

England
Watson travelled to England in 1914 on the S.S. Mooltan  in the company of two other Australian aviators, Harry Hawker and Harry Kauper  and, upon the recommendation of Hawker, he joined the Sopwith Aviation Company as an engineer (where he was able to learn about the latest trends in aviation and aviation technology) and, at the same time, he undertook flying lessons. Watson received his official aviator’s certificate following his training with the Hall School of Flying at the London Aerodrome, at Hendon, in October 1915.

Soon he was employed as a military test pilot. However, following the injuries he sustained in a crash on 22 June 1915, he was declared medically unfit for service; and he returned to Australia. 
Watson . . . was seconded as a test pilot to the Imperial Army being based at Brooklands airfield, where he undertook trial flights of new aircraft.On a fateful test flight on 22 June 1915, Watson took off from Brooklands piloting a new Sopwith aircraft powered by a 150 h.p., Sunbeam V-8 engine.He had barely cleared the airfield climbing to just 150 ft when four cylinders suddenly failed, causing the engine to seize and the plane began rapidly descending.With no time to turn the plane around and return to the airfield, Watson narrowly avoided a house and steered for gap in the heavy tree cover, but collided with a tree trunk at 90 miles per hour.He was fortunate to escape with a nasty gash on his head, a few cuts and bruises and a severe case of concussion.Although he would fully recover after several month convalescence, Watson was ruled medically unfit for further service, bringing to a premature end his hopes of an extended military aviation career.

Australia
Upon his return to Australia, he began constructing his own biplane, using a Gnome rotary engine he had purchased from Horrie Miller, and "modelled on the Sopwith Scout", at Follacleugh, in St Kilda Street, Elsternwick, the family residence; and, at the end of 1916, he received permission to test his plane  which he flew between Point Cook, Bendigo, and Melbourne.

In 1917 he set up an air mail experiment, where he delivered 1,300 postcards to Melbourne from Mount Gambier. Discussions begun to expand the service to other towns.

Death
"1917. 28th. March.—Sensational aviation tragedy near Point Cook. The Victorian aviator, Basil Watson, killed by a fall of 2,000 feet caused by the collapse of his bi-plane." — Victorian Year Book 1917-18.
Watson, promoted as "The Wizard of the Void", "The Athlete of the Sky", and "The Magician of the Air", was scheduled to demonstrate his flying prowess and aerobatic skills at a special fund-raising carnival for the Red Cross to be held at Caulfield Racecourse on Thursday 29 March 1917. He died on Wednesday, 28 March 1917, the day before the event, at the age of 23, when his aeroplane crashed in Port Phillip Bay.
On 28 March, Watson arranged to make a test flight from Albert Park to Point Cook, were he could leave the plane in one of the hangars overnight.Arriving over Point Cook around 3:40 pm, Watson proceeded to entertain soldiers stationed at an adjoining A.I.F. camp with a display of his typical aerobatic feats.Having successfully completed a "loop the loop", he banked the plane to enter a steep dive at 2000 ft (600 m), when suddenly a small clip securing part of the aircraft gave way and the wings appeared to fold back on themselves, causing the aircraft to plummet headlong towards the ground.Watson could be seen desperately trying to regain control, before realising that all hope was lost, and instead steering the plane away from the crowd of thousands of spectators.The aircraft plunged into the sea almost nose first, crumpling on impact in less than a metre of water close to the shoreline.Basil Watson was severely injured and died moments later as the first witnesses arrived on the scene wading out to the wreckage.

Burial
He was buried at Boroondara General Cemetery, Kew, two days later.
"At the same time as the funeral in Melbourne, the bells of St Paul's Cathedral in Bendigo played the hymn Rock of Ages; the fire bell, which had previously rung to alert Bendigonians to the arrival of Watson and his plane also rang to mourn his passing." (Terri-Anne Kingsley, 2016)

See also

 Harry Houdini: The Aviator — Houdini's flight at Diggers Rest, Friday, 18 March 1910.

Notes

References  
 Aitken, Richard (2004), Gardenesque: A Celebration of Australian Gardening, Carlton, Victoria: Miegunyah Press. 
 Churchward, Matthew (2017), "Basil George Watson, Pioneering Aviator (1894-1917)", Museums Victoria Collections.
 Eustis, Nelson (1967), Basil G. Watson, Pioneer Airmail: The Mount Gambier to Melbourne, 1917 Experimental Air Mail, Adelaide: Nelson Eustis.
 Eustis, Nelson (2003), "Basil G. Watson", Stamp News Australasia, Vol.50, No.4, (May 2003), p.56-57.
 Kepert, J.L. (1993), "Aircraft Accident Investigation at ARL: The First 50 Years", (General Document 37), Fishermans Bend, Victoria: Department of Defence: Defence Science and Technology Organisation: Aeronautical Research Laboratory.
 Lockley, Tom (2017), Australia's Second Air Mail: The Aviation Career of Basil Watson, 1893-1917, Pyrmont, NSW: Tom Lockley. 
 Meggs, Keith Raymond (2009), Australian-built Aircraft and the Industry, Volume 1: 1884 to 1939: Book 1, Seymour, Victoria: Four Finger Publishing. 
 Parsons, Les & Battams, Samantha (2019), The Red Devil: The Story of South Australian Aviation Pioneer, Captain Harry Butler, AFC, Mile End: Wakefield Press. 
 Winter, Carol (2015), Basil Watson: Pioneer Aviator, Blackburn: Penfolk Publishing. 
 Victorian Coroner's Report (VPRS 24/P0000: 1917/328) on the Death of Basil George Watson: date of hearing 19 April 1917, collection of the Public Record Office Victoria.

External links

 Exhibition of aviation by Basil Watson : Australia's brilliant aviator, 1917. State Library Victoria.
 Basil G Watson at Victorian Collections 
 TROVE List: Basil George Watson.

1893 births
1917 deaths
People from Bendigo
People educated at Haileybury (Melbourne)
Australian aviators
Aviators killed in aviation accidents or incidents in Australia
Victims of aviation accidents or incidents in 1917
Aviation in Australia